Yaroslav Yaroslavenko (March 30, 1880 – June 26, 1958) was a Ukrainian composer who wrote the music for "Za Ukrainu" and a son of Ukrainian writer and poet Demeter Więckowski and Anna de Weryha-Wysoczańska-Pietrusiewicz.

He studied at the Lviv Conservatory from 1898 to 1900, and graduated with a degree in engineering from the Lviv Polytechnic Institute in 1904. He co-founded the Torban music publishing house in 1906 and was its director for over thirty years.

References 
"Yaroslavenko, Yaroslav." Encyclopedia of Ukraine V [St-Z]. Toronto: University of Toronto Press, 2016.
"Yaroslavenko, Yaroslav." in: Bernandt, G. and A. Dolzhanskiĭ. Sovetskie Kompozitory: Kratkiĭ Biograficheskiĭ Spravochnik. Moskva: Sovetskiĭ Kompozitor, 1957.

1880 births
1958 deaths
People from Drohobych
People from the Kingdom of Galicia and Lodomeria
Ukrainian Austro-Hungarians
Lviv Polytechnic alumni
Male composers
Ukrainian composers
Prisoners and detainees of Poland
20th-century male musicians